Havana ("turn left in Havana") is a club passing pattern. There are 4 jugglers with a total of 12 clubs and the pattern is a type of rotating feed, much like a feed weave. Feeders do a 2 count (everies) while feedees do a 6 count. All passes are right hand tramline.

There is always one feeder, but the feeder changes throughout. When feeding, jugglers begin passing to feedee B and making 5 passes in a windshield wiper fashion.

After the first pass, feedee B and C begin to switch places in a clockwise motion. After the places have been exchanged and the feeder has given their 4th pass, B takes one additional step forward and turns counter clockwise (see: "turn left"), such that D will be the new feeder.

Once A finishes their 5th pass, D immediately begins their feed cycle starting on their left. A has no break between A's 5th pass and D's first pass.

Some find that practicing a 4-person feed weave with a single feeder is a good warm up for this pattern.

Variations 

Phoenix ("turn right in Phoenix"): is the same as Havana but the feeder starts with a pass to the rightmost feedee.
Albuquerque ("turn right in Albuquerque"); is the same as Havana, but mirrored, so all passes are with your left hands.

Juggling patterns and tricks